Susan Shapiro is the American author of 17 books, including The Byline Bible, Five Men Who Broke My Heart, Only as Good as Your Word, Lighting Up, Speed Shrinking, and What's Never Said, and coauthor of The Bosnia List and the New York Times bestseller Unhooked.

She has written for The New Yorker, The New York Times, The Washington Post, The Wall Street Journal, Newsweek, The Nation, The Daily Beast, Salon.com, Oprah.com, Glamour, and Marie Claire magazines.

Shapiro was on the board of the National Book Critics Circle and has been an award-winning writing professor at The New School and New York University since 1993. Her writing and publishing advice to students was compiled in The Byline Bible.

She is married to TV/film writer Charlie Rubin.

Works

Non-fiction 
 The Male-to-Female Dictionary, Berkley Trade, 1996, 
 Food for the Soul: Selections from the Holy Apostles Soup Kitchen Writers Workshop, co-edited with Elizabeth Maxwell, Seabury Books, 2000, 
 Five Men Who Broke My Heart: A Memoir, Delacorte Press, 2004, 
 Lighting Up: How I Stopped Smoking, Drinking, and Everything Else I Loved in Life Except Sex: A Memoir, Delacorte Press, 2004, 
 Secrets of a Fix-up Fanatic: How to Meet & Marry Your Match, Delta, 2006, 
 Only as Good as Your Word: Writing Lessons from My Favorite Literary Gurus, Seal Press, 2007, 
 Toxic Friends: The Antidote for Women Stuck in Complicated Friendships, St. Martin's Press, 2009, 
 Unhooked: How to Quit Anything, MJF, 2014, 
 The Bosnia List: A Memoir of War, Exile, and Return, co-authored with Kenan Trebincevic, Penguin Books, 2014, 
 Kick Your Addiction: How to Quit Anything, co-authored with Frederick Woolverton, Skyhorse Publishing, 2014, 
 The Byline Bible: Get Published in Five Weeks, Writer's Digest Books, 2018, 
 Barbie: 60 Years of Inspiration, Assouline, 2019, 
 The Forgiveness Tour: How to Find the Perfect Apology, Skyhorse Publishing, 2021, ISBN 978-1510762718

Fiction 
 Speed Shrinking, Thomas Dunne Books, 2009, 
 Overexposed: A novel, Thomas Dunne Books, 2010, 
 What's Never Said, Heliotrope Books, 2015,

References

External links 
  
 The Today Show
 The Early Show
 Lisa Loeb's #1 Single
 NY Weekend Today
 Whatever with Alexis and Jennifer on Hallmark Channel
 Channel 7 Detroit

Living people
American non-fiction writers
Year of birth missing (living people)
American women non-fiction writers
21st-century American women